The Whitest Kids U' Know is a compilation of skits by the New York-based sketch comedy troupe of the same name. It was released in 2006 on the label What Are Records?. The album includes songs that are featured in the first season of the Whitest Kids U' Know television show as well as several audio skits.

Writers: Trevor Moore, Zach Cregger, Sam Brown, Darren Trumeter, Timmy Williams

Track listing

Tracks 2, 5, 7 and 11 are absent on the skits-only digital download version of the album.

References

2006 debut albums
The Whitest Kids U' Know albums